was a Japanese daimyō of the Edo period, who ruled the Owari Domain. His childhood name was Kumagoro (熊五郎).

Family
 Father: Tokugawa Munekatsu
 Mother: Okayo no Kata
 Wife: Konoe Yoshigimi, eldest daughter of Konoe Iehisa
 Children:
 Tokugawa Haruyoshi (1753-1773) by Kokun
 Tokugawa Haruoki (1756-1776) by Kokun

References

1733 births
1800 deaths
Lords of Owari